The Moving On! Tour was a symphonic concert tour by the British rock band the Who, partially in support of their album Who.

Overview
The Moving On! Tour consisted of 29 performances in North America and the United Kingdom. The tour was announced on January 11, 2019, and included local symphonic orchestras accompanying the Who at each performance. Pete Townshend and Roger Daltrey are the only remaining members of the group, along with longtime touring members Simon Townshend and Zak Starkey, and an ensemble of others.  The tour was cut short in March 2020 by the COVID-19 pandemic.  Ten shows in Ireland and the United Kingdom were eventually rescheduled for March 2021, but those were canceled a month before the fact in February 2021 and the band has announced no further plans.

Tour band
The Who
 Roger Daltrey – lead vocals, harmonica, acoustic guitar, rhythm guitar, tambourine
 Pete Townshend – lead and rhythm guitar, acoustic guitar, backing and lead vocals

Backing musicians
 Simon Townshend – rhythm guitar, acoustic guitar, backing vocals
 Loren Gold – piano, keyboards, jaw harp, backing vocals
 Jon Button – bass guitar, backing vocals
 Zak Starkey – drums, percussion
 Billy Nicholls – backing vocals, tambourine
 Katie Jacoby – violin
 Audrey Snyder – cello

Typical set lists
(*) = without orchestra

Spring 2019
A four-week tour in North America began on May 7 at Van Andel Arena in Grand Rapids, Michigan and ended on May 30 at PPG Paints Arena in Pittsburgh. A track from the band's 1975 album The Who by Numbers, "Imagine a Man", made its live debut during this tour, and "Won't Get Fooled Again" was played in an acoustic version. A typical set list of this leg was as follows (all songs written by Pete Townshend):

 "Overture"
 "It's a Boy"
 "1921"
 "Amazing Journey"
 "The Acid Queen" (dropped after May 7)
 "Sparks"
 "Pinball Wizard"
 "We're Not Gonna Take It"
 "Who Are You"
 "Eminence Front"
 "Imagine a Man"
 "Join Together" or "You Better You Bet"*
 "The Kids Are Alright"* or "Substitute"*
 "I Can See for Miles"* or "The Seeker"*
 "Won't Get Fooled Again"*
 "Behind Blue Eyes"
 "Tea & Theatre"*
 "The Real Me"
 "I'm One"
 "The Punk and the Godfather"
 "5:15"
 "Drowned"
 "The Rock"
 "Love, Reign o'er Me"
 "Baba O'Riley"

Autumn 2019

After a show at Wembley Stadium in London, England on June 1, another North American tour started on September 1 at Madison Square Garden in New York City and stopped on October 24 at the Hollywood Bowl in Los Angeles. The setlist of the Autumn leg was not very different from the Spring leg, but two new songs from their upcoming album Who were debuted: "Hero Ground Zero" and "Ball and Chain", previously known as "Guantanamo". A typical setlist of this tour is as follows (all songs written by Pete Townshend):

 "Overture"
 "1921"
 "Amazing Journey"
 "Sparks"
 "Pinball Wizard"
 "We're Not Gonna Take It"
 "Who Are You"
 "Eminence Front"
 "Imagine a Man"
 "Join Together" or "You Better You Bet"
 "Hero Ground Zero"
 "I Can See for Miles"* or "The Seeker"*
 "Won't Get Fooled Again"*
 "Behind Blue Eyes"
 "Ball and Chain"
 "The Real Me"
 "I'm One"
 "The Punk and the Godfather"
 "5:15"
 "Drowned"
 "The Rock"
 "Love, Reign o'er Me"
 "Baba O'Riley"

Tour dates

Cancelled shows

See also
List of The Who tours and performances

Notes

References

The Who concert tours
2019 concert tours
2020 concert tours
Concert tours of North America
Concert tours postponed due to the COVID-19 pandemic